Satyrium auretorum, or gold-hunter's hairstreak, is a species of hairstreak in the butterfly family Lycaenidae. It is found in North America.

The MONA or Hodges number for Satyrium auretorum is 4286.

Subspecies
These three subspecies belong to the species Satyrium auretorum:
 Satyrium auretorum auretorum (Boisduval, 1852)
 Satyrium auretorum fumosum J. Emmel & Mattoni, 1990
 Satyrium auretorum spadix (Hy. Edwards, 1881)

References

Further reading

 

Eumaeini
Articles created by Qbugbot
Butterflies described in 1852